League of Sarajevo Canton is a fourth level league in the Bosnia and Herzegovina football league system. The league champion is promoted to the Second League of the Federation of Bosnia and Herzegovina - Center. It is divided in two groups.

Member clubs

Group A
List of clubs competing in 2020–21 season: 

 NK Bojnik
 NK Jedinstvo Ljubnići
 NK Ozren Semizovac
 NK Pofalićki
 ŠFK Respekt
 NK Stup
 FK Vratnik

Group B
List of clubs competing in 2020–21 season: 

 FK Baton
 FK Igman Ilidža
 FK Mladost Župča
 FK Butmir
 FK Hrid
 FK Saobraćajac
 FK El Tarik
 NK Omladinac Stup-Doglodi

References

4
Bos